Lowell is an unincorporated community in Cherokee County, Kansas, United States.  As of the 2020 census, the population of the community and nearby areas was 244.

History
A post office was opened in Lowell in 1868, and remained in operation until it was discontinued in 1905.

Geography
Lowell is located in southeastern Cherokee County near the southeastern corner of Kansas. It is bordered to the north by the Spring River, a tributary of the Neosho River. Across the river is the community of Riverton.

Demographics

For statistical purposes, the United States Census Bureau has defined Lowell as a census-designated place (CDP).

References

Further reading

External links
 Cherokee County maps: Current, Historic, KDOT

Census-designated places in Cherokee County, Kansas
Census-designated places in Kansas